Sir Run Run Shaw Hospital (SRRSH), or Shao Yifu Hospital, is a hospital affiliated with the Medical School of Zhejiang University, in Hangzhou, Zhejiang, China.

Overview
The 1200-bed hospital was built with a donation of about 100 million yuan from the Hong Kong media mogul and philanthropist Sir Run Run Shaw, a Zhejiang native. Construction began in October 1989 and the hospital was opened on May 2, 1994.

December 23, 2006, the hospital became the first in mainland China accredited by the JCI, the Joint Commission International; a US-based organization for medical quality evaluation.

The hospital is also a teaching and researching base for medical students and scholars. It cooperates with and receives funding from the American Loma Linda University (LLU). It has student exchange programs with the United States, Germany, Japan, India, and Hong Kong.

References

Hospital buildings completed in 1994
Hospitals under Zhejiang University School of Medicine
Hospitals in Zhejiang
Buildings and structures in Hangzhou
1994 establishments in China
Hospitals established in 1994